Harttia leiopleura is a species of armored catfish endemic to Brazil, where it is found in the Das Velhas River basin.  This species grows to a length of  SL.

References
 

leiopleura
Catfish of South America
Fish of Brazil
Endemic fauna of Brazil
Taxa named by Osvaldo Takeshi Oyakawa
Fish described in 1993